Sultan Sulaiman Royal Mosque is Selangor's royal mosque, which is located in Klang, Selangor, Malaysia. It was constructed by the British in the early 1932 and was officially opened in 1933 by the late Almarhum Sultan Sir Alaeddin Sulaiman Shah.

This mosque combines various types of architectural styles (such as Moorish and Art Deco) and interior and exterior designs not replicated in other mosques around the country. Sultan Sulaiman Mosque was the main state mosque of Selangor until the opening of Sultan Salahuddin Abdul Aziz Mosque in the new capital city of Shah Alam. Some of its interesting features include the Tangga Diraja (royal stairs) from Istana Alam Shah and a royal mausoleum. The late Sultan Salahuddin was buried in the mosque's grounds.

Architecture

The design concept of the Sultan Sulaiman Mosque is quite different from other mosques in the state, as well as in the rest of Malaysia's as it notably exhibits a combination of influences of Islamic architecture, Moorish, English, Neoclassical cathedral, and most importantly, Western Art Deco styles. It was designed by the British architect Leofric Kesteven (1882-1974), who was the Chairman of the Malayan Institute of Architects from 1931 to 1933, along with John Thomas Chester, the reinforced concrete specialist attached to United Engineers Ltd; and Rodolfo Nolli, the Singapore-based Italian sculptor who worked on the ornaments of the building.

The semicircular-shaped dome of the mosque is painted in egg yellow, not gold. The large dome of the main prayer space is surrounded by four smaller domes. The main dome represents the Sultan of Selangor while the smaller domes refer to Dato' Besar Empat Suku Selangor. Five domes at the main entrance of the mosque symbolise the Five Pillars of Islam and five Daeng Brothers, while two umbrella-shaped domes are symbolic of the royal umbrella. There are eight smaller towers around the mosque and a large tower in the middle, with a higher entrance from the main porch. The tower is also decorated with yellow dome at the summit. The original design of the mosque was like a cross bar when viewed from above, as is so often used in church plans in Europe, but after renovations by the Selangor Islamic Religious Department (JAIS), the mosque now has a square footprint.

The present mosque has been through a number of processes and internal modifications; the most recent restoration was completed in 2017, which restored 70 panels of its colourful original bas-reliefs, which were covered with cement and white paint, which is the only kind found in mosques around Malaysia. The bas-reliefs feature the natural scenery and plants of Klang District. They are coloured brightly using hues of red, yellow, blue, and green.

The main prayer room Sultan Sulaiman Mosque is octagonal at the bottom, but it slowly smoothens into a circle at a height of 10 meters. The upper floors can be accessed with 'catladder'. There are decorative iron frames under the dome that support the multi-coloured patterned glass. The mosque was designed to accommodate about 1,000 pilgrims at a time.

History
Sultan Sulaiman Mosque was given as a gift by the British Government to then-Sultan of Selangor, Sultan Sulaiman Alaeddin Shah to commemorate the declaration of Klang as a royal town and to replace the old and unsafe Pengkalan Batu Mosque which was demolished during the construction of Klang train station. He laid the foundation stone of this mosque in 1932.

According to history, before the building of the mosque commenced, a groundbreaking, qibla determination, and prayer ceremony was performed. This ceremony, attended by royalties, government officials, religious figures, architects and British officers, amongst others, was held in order to accurately pinpoint the position of qibla, or the direction towards the Kaaba in the Sacred Mosque in Mecca. The method used was through observing the shadows cast by vertical objects.

The mosque was officiated on 23 June 1933 by the Sultan, during a ceremony attended by the public as well as some prominent guests including the Raja Muda of Selangor, TS Adams (The British Resident of Selangor), L. Kesteven (the architect of the mosque), Raja Haji Othman (Chief Kadhi) besides various Malay chiefs, religious officers and European officials. During its opening, the mosque was reportedly the largest mosque in the then-Federated Malay States. Originally, this mosque was known as Masjid Suleiman Jamiur Rahman and it served as Selangor's state mosque until the completion of Sultan Salahuddin Abdul Aziz Mosque in Shah Alam in 1988. The Sultan Sulaiman Mosque remained as the royal mosque.

In May 2012, the mosque was declared a National Heritage Building under the National Heritage Act 2005 (Act 645). The building underwent a number of upgrades and renovations in 1933, 1949, 1953-54, 1958, 1966, 1968, 1970s, 1980s, 1990s and 2000s. Between March 2015 and October 2017, the mosque was closed to the public for restoration works that cost 12 million ringgit and aimed to retain the original architecture and design of the mosque. The conservation project involved processes that included the cleaning of the mural surfaces, treatments to strengthen the murals and painting some parts of the mosque including in the main prayer room.

Royal Mausoleum

List of graves
This is a list of Sultans and members of the royal family who have been laid to rest in the mosque.

Sultan graves
Sultan Sir Alaeddin Sulaiman Shah ibni Almarhum Raja Muda Musa (died: 31 March 1938)
Sultan Musa Ghiatuddin Riayat Shah ibni Almarhum Sultan Sir Alaeddin Sulaiman Shah (died: 8 November 1955)
Sultan Sir Hisamuddin Alam Shah ibni Almarhum Sultan Sir Alaeddin Sulaiman Shah – 2nd Yang di-Pertuan Agong (1960) (died: 1 September 1960)
Sultan Salahuddin Abdul Aziz Shah ibni Almarhum Sultan Sir Hisamuddin Alam Shah – 11th Yang di-Pertuan Agong (1999-2001) (died: 21 November 2001)

Tengku Ampuan/Pemaisuri graves (Graves of Royal Consorts)
 Raja Fatimah binti Al-Marhum Sultan Idris I Murshidul Al Azzam Rahmatullah ( died 8 April 1983)                 
Tengku Pemaisuri Sharifah Mastura binti Syed Shahabuddin of Kedah (died 1958)Tengku Ampuan Jemaah binti Raja Ahmad (died: 8 April 1973)Tengku Ampuan Rahimah binti Almarhum Sultan Abdul Aziz Langkat (died: 27 June 1993)Royal family graves
R. Azmi – Malay actors and singers (died 1974)Raja Tun Sir Uda bin Raja Mohammad – Second Menteri Besar (Chief Minister) of Selangor (1949-1953) and first Yang di-Pertua Negeri (Governor) of Penang (1957-1967) (died 1976)Tengku Hajah Raihani binti Almarhum Sultan Sir Alaeddin Sulaiman Shah (Tengku Ampuan of Brunei 1934-1950) (died 22 September 1993)Tengku Khaladiah binti Almarhum Sultan Sir Alaeddin Sulaiman Shah (died 2013)Tengku Azman Shah ibni Almarhum Sultan Sir Hisamuddin Alam Shah – Tengku Bendahara Selangor (died 2014)Tengku Toh Puan Nur Sa'adah binti Almarhum Sultan Sir Alaeddin Sulaiman Shah (died 2014)Tengku Muhammad Yusof Shah ibni Almarhum Sultan Sir Alaeddin Sulaiman Shah – Tengku Aris Temenggong Selangor (died 3 January 2018)Tengku Ismail Shah Ibni Almarhum Sultan Hisamuddin Alam Shah – Tengku Besar Putra Selangor (died 2019)''
Tengku Thuraya binti Almarhum Sultan Ibrahim – Tengku Puan Bendahara Selangor (died 2021)

Transportation
Seranas Group bus route 702 and Smart Selangor (rapidKL) bus route KLG3a and KLG3b from  KTM Klang via Jalan Kota Raja Federal Route 190.

See also
 Islam in Malaysia

References

Klang (city)
Mosques in Selangor
Mausoleums in Malaysia
Art Deco architecture in Malaysia
Mosques completed in 1934
Mosque buildings with domes
1934 establishments in British Malaya